Burmington is a village and civil parish in Warwickshire, England. The population at the 2001 Census was 127, increasing to 164 at the 2011 Census.

References

External links

Villages in Warwickshire
Civil parishes in Warwickshire